Henry Alan Gilroy (born November 1976) is an American film and television screenwriter and producer. He is best known for co-writing the animated series Star Wars: The Clone Wars.

Early life
From an early age, Gilroy loved comic books and animation which inspired him to study film at several colleges in the greater Los Angeles area.

Career
His first job at a Hollywood studio was working as an editor for Warner Bros.' animation department working Steven Spielberg's Tiny Toon Adventures. It was at Warner Bros. that Gilroy sold his first script to the producers of the Emmy winning Batman: The Animated Series, for the Scarecrow episode, Nothing to Fear. After a staff writer gig on the WB's Tazmanian Devil animated series, Tazmania, Gilroy moved on to work on The Tick animated series before taking a staff job at Disney Television Animation for several years where he worked on such series as Timon and Pumbaa, Mickey Mouse Works, House of Mouse, Lilo & Stitch and Super Robot Monkey Team Hyperforce Go! before being chosen to develop and write the Star Wars: The Clone Wars CG animated series for Lucasfilm Animation with creator George Lucas and director Dave Filoni. He served as head writer for season one and part of season two, penning several episodes, including the first stories featuring fan favorite character Ahsoka Tano, among others. He is also the author of several Star Wars comic books.

Leaving Lucasfilm, Gilroy spent two years at Hasbro Studios, where he developed and led the writing on two other animated series, G.I. Joe: Renegades and Kaijudo, and then moved on to Marvel Animation Studios where he acted as supervising producer and head writer on Hulk and the Agents of S.M.A.S.H. and Ultimate Spider-Man as well as penning two CG Marvel Heroes United films featuring team-ups with Iron Man & the Hulk and Iron Man & Captain America.

Gilroy is co-creator of the first Bionicle trilogy and has since written for numerous other animated series, such as The Mask, Justice League Unlimited, The 99, Kim Possible, and the direct-to-video Disney movie title Atlantis: Milo's Return and the Funimation anime film Mass Effect: Paragon Lost based on the hit video game for Electronic Arts and BioWare.

Gilroy wrote the four-issue Joker/Mask comic book which was collected by Dark Horse/DC Comics in 2001. He also wrote the Dark Horse Alien one-shot comic books, Aliens: Herk Mondo and Aliens: Mondo Heat in collaboration with artist and Pixar director Ronnie del Carmen.

In 2014, Gilroy returned to Lucasfilm under Disney studios to serve as co-executive producer and series writer of Star Wars: Rebels where he wrote seventeen episodes through 2018.

In 2019, Gilroy was selected as the showrunner/head writer for an animated Magic: The Gathering TV show for Netflix with the Russo Brothers.

In 2020, Gilroy began working on DreamWorks Dragons: The Nine Realms, an animated television series for DreamWorks Animation.

Television and film credits

Television
 series head writer denoted in bold
Batman: The Animated Series (1992)
2 Stupid Dogs (1993)
The Tick (1994)
Taz-Mania (1994)
The Baby Huey Show (1994)
The Mask: Animated Series (1995)
Earthworm Jim (1995)
The Savage Dragon (1995–1996)
The Mouse and the Monster (1996)
All Dogs Go to Heaven: The Series (1998)
Timon & Pumbaa (1999)
Sherlock Holmes in the 22nd Century (1999)
Jackie Chan Adventures (2001)
Teamo Supremo (2002)
House of Mouse (2002)
Lilo & Stitch: The Series (2003)
Justice League Unlimited (2004)
Super Robot Monkey Team Hyperforce Go! (2006)
Star Wars: The Clone Wars (2008–2010)
Transformers Animated (2008)
The Secret Saturdays (2009)
G.I. Joe: Renegades (2010–2011)
Iron Man: Armored Adventures (2012)
Kaijudo: Rise of the Duel Masters (2012)
Voltron Force (2012)
Hulk and the Agents of S.M.A.S.H. (2012–2013)
Teenage Mutant Ninja Turtles (2014)
Ultimate Spider-Man Season 3 (2014)
Star Wars Rebels (2014–2018)
Avengers Assemble (2017)
Guardians of the Galaxy (2017)
DreamWorks Dragons: The Nine Realms (2021–present)

Film
Mickey's House of Villains (2002)
Atlantis: Milo’s Return (2003)
Bionicle: Mask of Light (2003)
Bionicle 2: Legends of Metru Nui (2004)
Bionicle 3: Web of Shadows (2005)
Star Wars: The Clone Wars (2008)
Mass Effect: Paragon Lost (2012)
Heroes United (2013–2014)

References

External links
 
 Star Wars: Clone Wars Interview with Henry Gilroy . GalacticBinder. Retrieved on October 30, 2008.

1976 births
American male screenwriters
American male television writers
American television producers
American television writers
DreamWorks Animation people
Living people
Lucasfilm people